is a railway station on the East Japan Railway Company (JR East) Tsugaru Line located in the village of Yomogita, Aomori Prefecture, Japan.

Lines

Station layout
Seheji Station has one side platform serving a single bi-directional track. The station building consists only of a waiting room and is unattended.

History
Seheji Station was opened on December 5, 1951, as a station on the Japanese National Railways (JNR). With the privatization of the JNR on April 1, 1987, it came under the operational control of JR East, and has been unattended since the early 1990s. The station building was rebuilt in 2000.

Surrounding area

See also
 List of Railway Stations in Japan

External links

 

Stations of East Japan Railway Company
Railway stations in Aomori Prefecture
Tsugaru Line
Yomogita, Aomori
Railway stations in Japan opened in 1951